The Shrine of Mary, Queen of Peace, Our Lady of EDSA, or more popularly, the EDSA Shrine is a small church of the Roman Catholic Archdiocese of Manila located at the intersection of Ortigas Avenue and Epifanio de los Santos Avenue (EDSA) in Barangay Ugong Norte, Quezon City. The church is also called the Archdiocesan Shrine of Mary, Queen of Peace or Mary, Queen of Peace Quasi-Parish, although these names are seldom used. It is also a declared Important Cultural Property by the National Commission for Culture and the Arts.

Built in 1989 on donated land to commemorate the People Power Revolution, the shrine is the site of two peaceful demonstrations that toppled Presidents Ferdinand Marcos (the People Power Revolution or EDSA I) in 1986, and Joseph Estrada (the EDSA Revolution of 2001 or EDSA II).

The EDSA Shrine is the northernmost tip of the Ortigas Center, a financial and commercial district occupying large tracts of land in Quezon City, Mandaluyong, and Pasig.

History
Archbishop Jaime Cardinal Sin proposed the construction of a commemorative shrine two days after the Marcos family went into exile following the People Power Revolution of February 1986 which saw the deposing of President Ferdinand Marcos, the end of his authoritarian regime and the installation of Corazon Aquino as his successor. Sin made the proposal as an act of thanksgiving to the Virgin Mary to whom devout Catholics attribute the success of the peaceful revolution.

The concept for a commemorative shrine developed when Sin and Bishop Gabriel Reyes were en route to Camp Aguinaldo to preside a Thanksgiving Mass. At a corner of Epifanio de los Santos and Ortigas Avenues, Reyes pointed out to Sin the site where a group of protesters, which included Catholic religious sisters, offered flowers to soldiers during the revolution. At an empty lot nearby stood two billboards that featured advertisements by the Family Rosary Crusade. The billboards showed the image of the Virgin Mary along with the slogans "The family that prays together stays together" and "A world at prayer is a world at peace". The two clergymen concluded that the success of the revolution was a miracle that could be attributed to the intercession of the Virgin Mary. They compared the EDSA event to the success of the Battle of Lepanto and Battles of La Naval de Manila which also both ended in victories for the Catholic belligerents (i.e., the Venetians and Spaniards in Lepanto against the Muslim Ottomans and the Spaniards against the Protestant Dutch forces in Manila).

Cardinal Sin convinced the Ortigas and Gokongwei family to donate the corner lot where the EDSA Shrine now stands today The shrine was initially planned to be built inside Camp Crame, but plans were scrapped because churches built on government-owned property had to be ecumenical in nature.

EDSA Shrine was then constructed with Francisco Mañosa as architect. Leandro Locsin and William Coscolluela was also involved with the preparatory work of the building. The construction was almost finished by November 1989 and the shrine was set to be inaugurated by December 8, 1989, the date of the Feast of the Immaculate Conception. However such plans were interrupted by a coup attempt which began on November 29, 1989 by the Reform the Armed Forces Movement against President Corazon Aquino.

The coup attempt ended on December 7, 1989, and the inauguration went as planned which was never postponed by Cardinal Sin. The church was consecrated on December 15, 1989, and dedicated to the Virgin Mary on the same date. Socrates Villegas, then a priest, was installed as the church's first rector.

When the Second EDSA Revolution was successful in deposing President Joseph Estrada in January 2001, Sin declared the EDSA Shrine as a "Holy Ground", crediting the Virgin Mary to the event. A marker was installed on the anniversary of the 1986 People Power Revolution recognizing the shrine as a "Holy Ground". At the facade is set of sculptures recalling the events of the First and Second People Power Revolutions, the latter which was held there at the shrine.

Other rallies and demonstrations held in the shrine were: Pro-Estrada rally (April 25–May 1, 2001), protests against Reproductive Health Bill (August 4, 2012), EDSA Tayo rally against pork barrel (September 7, 2013), 2015 Iglesia ni Cristo protests (August 27–31, 2015) and Lord, Heal Our Land con-celebrated mass (November 5, 2017).

In 2019, the National Commission for Culture and the Arts declared the church as an Important Cultural Property.

Dedication 
Our Lady of Peace, Mother of Peace, Queen of Peace or Our Lady Queen of Peace is a title of the Blessed Virgin Mary in the Catholic Church. She is represented in art holding a dove and an olive branch – both traditional symbols of peace. The patronal image for this particular shrine is unique, as its design follows that of the statue atop the shrine roof. Mary, crowned and clad in golden robes, has her arms outstretched and her Immaculate Heart exposed, while two or three white doves rest at her hands and feet.

Her official memorial in the General Roman Calendar is on July 9 in the universal Church except for Hawaii and some churches in the United States, where it is kept on January 24.

Architecture and design

Francisco Mañosa was responsible for the architectural and structural design of the EDSA Shrine. The National Commission for Culture and the Arts (NCAA) described Mañosa's take on the building's design as a "modern take on Filipino architecture and adaptation of tropical architecture". The building is also noted for its "neovernacular" style and its distinguished "native architectural forms and indigenous materials" by architecture historian Gerard Lico.

The EDSA Shrine's design consisted of a promenade, the People's Plaza, with a statue of the Virgin Mary sculpted by Virginia Ty-Navarro as its focal point, and an underground church which was inspired from the Cathedral of Brasilia.

Mañosa envisioned a different design from the existing building. The architect's vision for the shrine, which he dubbed as the "People's Basilica" is derived from the concept of the bahay kubo but on a larger scale. The initial design called for the use of seven pitched roofs clustered together which framed a statue of the Virgin Mary. However one influential member of the committee objected to the design preferring a Spanish colonial design for the EDSA Shrine which caused Mañosa to withdraw from the project but was convinced by Cardinal Jaime Sin to remain committed to the project and made the design for the current building.

Our Lady of EDSA sculpture

The sculpture of the Virgin Mary as the Our Lady of EDSA, Queen of Peace is a prominent feature of the EDSA Shrine. The committee behind the construction of the EDSA Shrine commissioned sculptor Virginia Ty-Navarro for the sculpture. Napoleon Abueva was initially considered for the sculpture design but Abueva was recovering from a stroke at that time. Manny Casal was the second choice who proposed a marble sculpture of the Virgin Mary with open arms comforting people of various backgrounds; lay people, clergy, children, and soldiers. Casal intended the sculpture to be done on-site. Abueva and Casal while not selected to sculpt the shrine's main sculpture contributed other works installed within the shrine grounds.

Ty-Navarro sculpted the Virgin Mary sculpture in her studio in San Juan. The sculpture was transported to the shrine by helicopter with assistance from the United States embassy due to Ty-Navarro not anticipating that the road to the shrine is too narrow for the sculpture.

Rectors

Gallery

See also
 People Power Monument
 Bantayog ng mga Bayani
 People Power Revolution
 Our Lady of Peace
 Roman Catholic Archdiocese of Manila

References

External links 

EDSA Shrine website

People Power Revolution
Roman Catholic churches in Quezon City
Monuments and memorials in Metro Manila
Landmarks in the Philippines
Roman Catholic shrines in the Philippines
Statues of the Virgin Mary
Ortigas Center
Important Cultural Properties of the Philippines